The Peel Sessions is an EP that was released in 1988 of music recorded by Echo & the Bunnymen for a John Peel radio show in 1979. The tracks on the EP were recorded in studio number four at BBC Radio's Maida Vale Studios on 15 August 1979 and they were first transmitted on The John Peel Show on BBC Radio 1 on 22 August 1979. The EP reached number seven on the UK Indie Chart.

Recorded prior to Pete de Freitas joining the band, the percussion on the tracks was done by David Balfe, who co-produced the band's first single, "The Pictures on My Wall".

The EP was re-released in 1995 with a new cover.

Track listings
All tracks written by Will Sergeant, Ian McCulloch and Les Pattinson except where noted.

"Read It in Books" (McCulloch, Julian Cope) – 2:25
"Stars Are Stars" – 3:05
"I Bagsy Yours" – 2:50
"Villiers Terrace" – 4:10

Personnel

Musicians
Ian McCulloch – vocals, guitar
Will Sergeant – guitar
Les Pattinson – bass guitar
David Balfe – percussion, keyboards

Production
Trevor Dann – producer
Bob Jones – cutting engineer

References

1988 EPs
Echo and the Bunnymen
Live EPs
Echo & the Bunnymen EPs
1988 live albums